U.S. Route 69 (US 69) is a major north-south U.S. Highway in the U.S. state of Oklahoma. It extends the corridor formed by U.S. Route 75 in Texas, from Dallas northeast via McAlester and Muskogee to the Will Rogers Turnpike (Interstate 44) near Vinita. From Vinita to the Kansas state line, US-69 generally parallels the turnpike along old U.S. Highway 66.

Route description
The first few miles of highway north of the state line are freeway-grade, featuring three interchanges, including one at State Highway 91. Near Calera, the route downgrades to an expressway. On the west side of Durant, however, US-69/75 becomes a freeway again, beginning with an interchange with U.S. Highway 70, and followed by an interchange with SH-78. The freeway continues northeast, providing access to Armstrong, Caddo, and SH-22 before becoming an expressway once again at the Atoka County line.

In Atoka County, US-69/75 bypass Caney and Tushka to the west before coming to the SH-3/7 junction in the county seat of Atoka, Oklahoma; at this junction, SH-3 joins with the U.S. routes while SH-7 has its eastern terminus. North of this interchange, US-75 and SH-3 split off, leaving US-69 without any concurrent routes for the first time since crossing the Red River. Seven miles (11.3 km) northwest of Atoka, US-69 begins another concurrency, this time with SH-43, near Stringtown. The two routes run along the east shore of Atoka Lake before SH-43 splits off to the west. US-69 then heads through unincorporated Chockie, and then serves as the eastern terminus of SH-131 just south of the Pittsburg County line.

US-69 then crosses into Pittsburg County. US-69 runs just east of Kiowa, where it intersects State Highway 63 at its western terminus. US-69 runs along the east edge of the McAlester Army Ammunition Plant, which it provides access to via an interchange near Savanna. It then has an interchange with the Indian Nation Turnpike, after which it enters McAlester. US-69 mostly runs along the east side of McAlester, the county seat of Pittsburg County, with the downtown area being served by U.S. Highway 69 Business. The main route of US-69 has an interchange with US-270/SH-1/SH-31. North of McAlester, US-69 reunites with its business loop at an interchange which also serves as the southern terminus of SH-113. US-69 regains freeway status at this interchange, and begins crossing over several arms of Lake Eufaula. US-69 provides several interchanges for lake access. Other interchanges serve the northern terminus of SH-113 (which has both termini at US-69) and the western terminus of SH-9A. US-69 then crosses the main channel of the Canadian River into McIntosh County.

Soon after crossing into McIntosh Co., US-69 serves the county seat of Eufaula, with exits for US-69's Eufaula business loop and State Highway 9. The freeway then has an exit to the southern terminus of State Highway 150. US-69 then meets Interstate 40 at a cloverleaf interchange and has a pair of interchanges serving Checotah. The route then enters Muskogee County, where it has exits for Oktaha and Wainwright. The freeway then ends near Summit, and US-69 continues north at-grade.

US-69 meets the western terminus of State Highway 165 as it enters Muskogee. The route runs along the west side of the city, intersecting U.S. Highway 64 and briefly concurring with US-62. US-69 then crosses the Arkansas River into Wagoner County. Shortly after entering the county, the highway has an interchange with the Muskogee Turnpike, northeast of Tullahassee. In Wagoner, US-69 meets SH-51. It then enters Mayes County.

In Mayes County, the highway has an interchange with US-412 south of Chouteau. US-69 creates a spur to Sportsman Acres, SH-69A. The route then intersects SH-20 in Pryor and SH-28 in Adair. US-69 leaves Mayes County and enters Craig County south of Big Cabin. As the route approaches Big Cabin, signage affixed to the side of parked truck trailers warns of a speed zone, due to Big Cabin's former speed trap status. The trap was shut down by the Oklahoma Department of Public Safety on August 1, 2005. Just north of the town, US-69 has the first of three interchanges with Interstate 44, the Will Rogers Turnpike. After crossing the turnpike, the route begins a concurrency with US-60 into Vinita. The two U.S. routes serve as the southern terminus of SH-2 there. East of town, another access point to the turnpike is offered.

US-60/69 cut the northwest corner of Delaware County, entering just west of the northern terminus of State Highway 85. The routes then cross into Ottawa County, passing through Afton, before US-59 joins the concurrency. Just north of this, US-60 splits off at an interchange which also serves as the third entry to the Will Rogers Turnpike. Near Narcissa, US-59/69 passes the east end of SH-25. US-59 then splits off to follow SH-10 westbound, while SH-10 eastbound follows US-69 into Miami. The two routes concur briefly before splitting near downtown Miami, where US-69 forms a one-way couplet. After reuniting north of downtown, US-69 serves as a major arterial through the city, before leaving town and arcing northeast through North Miami and Commerce. US-69 then spawns U.S. Highway 69 Alternate to Quapaw and Baxter Springs, Kansas. The main route turns north, running through the Tar Creek Superfund site and abandoned community of Picher, before leaving Oklahoma and entering the state of Kansas.

History
U.S. Highway 69 in Oklahoma generally follows the old Texas Road.

All of US-69 between the US-60 junction west of Vinita and the western terminus of US-69 ALT is part of the former route of Route 66.

The Intermodal Surface Transportation Efficiency Act of 1991 requires the United States Secretary of Transportation to designate US-69 between the Texas state line and Checotah as an Interstate highway upon request from ODOT.

Major intersections

References

69
 Oklahoma
Transportation in Bryan County, Oklahoma
Transportation in Atoka County, Oklahoma
Transportation in Pittsburg County, Oklahoma
Transportation in McIntosh County, Oklahoma
Transportation in Muskogee County, Oklahoma
Transportation in Wagoner County, Oklahoma
Transportation in Mayes County, Oklahoma
Transportation in Craig County, Oklahoma
Transportation in Delaware County, Oklahoma
Transportation in Ottawa County, Oklahoma